The Commander of the Royal Netherlands Air Force (C-LSK) (Dutch: Commandant Luchtstrijdkrachten) is the highest-ranking officer of the Royal Netherlands Air Force. He reports directly to the Chief of the Netherlands Defence Staff (CDS).

The position of C-LSK was created on 5 September 2005 as part of a thorough reorganization within the Dutch Ministry of Defence in which the staffs (military and civilian) were reduced in size and an entire organizational layer was dropped. Before September 2005 the commanding officer of the Air Force was the Bevelhebber der Luchtstrijdkrachten (abbreviated BDL; the term also translates into English as Commander of the Royal Netherlands Air Force).

The Commander of the Royal Netherlands Air Force is statutorily a lieutenant general (NATO designation OF-8) and is the head of the Air Force Command (CLSK). He is responsible for preparation, operational command and completion of Air Force operations. In addition, at the request of the CDS, the C-LSK can take (joint) command of air operations carried out together with other branches of the Dutch armed forces or foreign militaries. And, also at the request of the CDS, he is permitted to render Air Force support to civilian authorities (foreign and domestic) to maintain the rule of law, combat disasters and provide humanitarian aid, transport patients or fight fires (as in forest fires; not political fires).

Commanders of the Royal Netherlands Air Force
1954–2005
 1954–1956 Anton Baretta
 1956–1961 Heije Schaper
 1961–1965 Hein Zielstra
 1965–1970 Bertie Wolff
 1970–1973 Flip van der Wolf
 1973–1976 Hans Knoop
 1976–1981 Rien Geschiere
 1981–1985 Cas Baas
 1985–1989 Fred de Jong
 1989–1992 Willy Cornelis Louwerse
 1992–1995 Heinz Manderfeld
 1995–2000 Ben Droste
 2000–2004 Dick Berlijn
 2004–2005 Dirk Starink

2005–present
 Lieutenant-General Hans de Jong (5 September 2005 – 29 May 2008)
 Lieutenant-General Jac Jansen (29 May 2008 – 9 March 2012)
 Lieutenant-General Sander Schnitger (9 March 2012 – 10 June 2016)
 Lieutenant-General Dennis Luyt (10 June 2016 – present)

See also
 Commander of the Royal Netherlands Army
 Commander of the Royal Netherlands Navy

External links
 Commandant Luchtstrijdkrachten from the website of the Dutch Ministry of Defence.

Royal Netherlands Air Force
Netherlands